Formica oreas is a species of ant in the family Formicidae.

Subspecies
These two subspecies belong to the species Formica oreas:
 Formica oreas comptula Wheeler, 1913
 Formica oreas oreas Wheeler, 1903

References

Further reading

 

oreas
Articles created by Qbugbot
Insects described in 1903